Eric Wennerberg, born January 21, 1917, in Landskrona, was a Swedish bobsledder who competed from the early 1950s to the late 1960s. He won a bronze medal in the four-man event at the 1961 FIBT World Championships in Lake Placid, New York.

Wennerberg died May 15, 2001, in Segeltorp.

References
Bobsleigh four-man world championship medalists since 1930
Eric Wennerberg Biography and Statistics
Sweden Bobsleigh at the 1968 Grenoble Winter Games
Eric Wennerberg - www.sok.se

1917 births
2001 deaths
Swedish male bobsledders
Olympic bobsledders of Sweden
Bobsledders at the 1968 Winter Olympics
People from Landskrona Municipality
Sportspeople from Skåne County
20th-century Swedish people